Dennis Appiah (born 9 June 1992) is a French professional footballer who plays for  club Saint-Étienne. He was a France youth international, having earned caps at under-16, under-17, and under-18 level. Appiah plays as a defensive midfielder and is also capable of playing in defence as a centre-back.

Career
On 19 May 2010, Appiah signed his first professional contract agreeing to a three-year deal. He made his professional debut on 1 August 2011 in a league match against Boulogne. He played the entire match, which ended 0–0.

On 3 January 2023, Appiah signed for Ligue 2's bottom club Saint-Étienne on a two-and-a-half year contract.

Career statistics

Club

Honours
Anderlecht
Belgian Super Cup: 2017

Nantes
Coupe de France: 2021–22

References

External links

 Club profile
 
 
 
 

Living people
1992 births
Footballers from Toulouse
Association football midfielders
French footballers
France youth international footballers
AS Monaco FC players
Stade Malherbe Caen players
R.S.C. Anderlecht players
FC Nantes players
AS Saint-Étienne players
Ligue 1 players
Ligue 2 players
Belgian Pro League players
French expatriate footballers
French expatriate sportspeople in Belgium
Expatriate footballers in Belgium
Black French sportspeople
French sportspeople of Ghanaian descent